The 8mm Roth–Steyr is a military centerfire pistol cartridge adopted by the Austro-Hungarian cavalry in 1907 for the Repetierpistole M7—the first self-loading pistol adopted by a major military power. The cartridge headspaces on the mouth of the case.  Ammunition was typically packaged in a unique ten-round charger. Austrian military production contained greased un-plated steel-jacketed bullets. A few private firms in Austria manufactured ammunition with cupro-nickel-jacketed bullets.

Synonyms
 8 Steyr
 8mm Steyr
 8mm Roth
 8mm Roth–Steyr
 8mm Steyr Armee Pistole
 8×18

See also
 8 mm caliber
 List of handgun cartridges

References

External links
 diagram of cartridge with measurements

Pistol and rifle cartridges
Military cartridges